Martin Crewes is an Australian stage, television and movie actor.

Early life
Crewes was born in London. He moved to Australia when he was 10 years of age, and attended the Western Australian Academy of Performing Arts, in Perth, Western Australia. Since graduating, Crewes has taken part in many stage plays and musical productions, both in Australia and internationally, and has also appeared in various television and movie productions.

Career
Crewes' stage musical theatre roles include Lt. Joe Cable in South Pacific, Marius in Les Misérables, Claud in Hair and Chino in West Side Story. Other stage musicals include Joseph and the Amazing Technicolor Dreamcoat, The Wizard of Oz and Aspects of Love.

Crewes originated the leading role of Walter Hartright in the West End production of The Woman in White (in which he starred from September 2004 to July 2005).

For his horse riding role as Jim Ryan in the Australian musical theatre production of The Man from Snowy River: Arena Spectacular, Crewes, who could already ride, was given intensive riding lessons by expert riding teacher Steve Jefferys so that he would not require a body double for the difficult riding feats he had to accomplish in the show.  Jefferys also taught Crewes the difficult art of being a horse whisperer. Horse whispering usually takes years to learn, but Crewes was able to master this difficult skill in only two weeks.

From 2011, he originated the role of Pasha/Strelnikov in the Australian premiere of Doctor Zhivago. His performance earned him a nomination for a Helpmann Award.

Following this in 2012, he performed in The Production Company's season of Chess as Frederick "Freddie" Trumper. Directed  by Gale Edwards, and ran for 10 performances (as standard for The Production Company). Crewes was nominated for a Green Room Award for Actor in a Leading Role.

Crewes' television and movie roles include Luis Amor Rodriguez in Dream Team, DOA: Dead or Alive as Guy on Boat, and a major role as Chad Kaplan in the 2002 film Resident Evil.

Awards
Green Room Awards 
 Winner (2002) for Male Artist in a Leading Role (Claude in Hair)
 Nominee (2002) for Male Artist in a Leading Role (Jim Ryan in The Man from Snowy River: Arena Spectacular)
 Nominee (2012) for Male Artist in a Leading Role (Freddy in Chess)

Helpmann Awards
 Nominee (2002) for Best Male Actor in a Musical (Rik in Oh! What a Night)
 Nominee (2011) for Best Male Actor in a Supporting Role in a Musical (Pasha/Strelnikov in Doctor Zhivago)

Filmography

References

External links

Martin Crewes, Australian Film Commission
Martin Crewes and The Man From Snowy River: Arena Spectacular, Post Newspapers
Martin Crewes, profile at photographer Roy Tan's website

Australian male film actors
Australian male musical theatre actors
Australian male stage actors
Australian male television actors
English emigrants to Australia
People from Chipping Barnet
Actors from Hertfordshire
Musicians from Hertfordshire
Living people
Year of birth missing (living people)
Western Australian Academy of Performing Arts alumni